Leutzsch is a western suburb of Leipzig in Saxony, Germany. It is part of the borough Alt-West.

References

Geography of Leipzig